Trefnant railway station served the village of Trefnant in North Wales.

History
It opened in 1858 and closed for passengers in 1955 and freight in 1957. Works were commenced in 1864 to double the line between Trefnant and the railway's junction with the Mold and Denbigh line.

The station platform and the siding area was still visible until the Llys Teg housing association estate was built around 1990.

There was a railway bridge at the top of "Hafod" on the A541 in the village which is now demolished but is still visible as a hump in the road.

References

Further reading

Disused railway stations in Denbighshire
Former London and North Western Railway stations
Railway stations in Great Britain opened in 1858
Railway stations in Great Britain closed in 1955